Steven Otis is an American politician from the state of New York. He is a member of the New York State Assembly, representing the 91st district. He is a member of the Democratic Party.

Otis served as chief of staff to State Senator Suzi Oppenheimer, and mayor of Rye, New York, from 1998 through 2009, when he was defeated for reelection by Douglas French. When Assemblyman George S. Latimer chose to run for the State Senate seat vacated by Oppenheimer in the 2012 elections rather than seek reelection, Otis chose to run for Latimer's seat.

Otis has served in the New York State Legislature since 2013. In 2020, he faced a primary challenge from Rye Democratic Committee Chairperson Meg Cameron. Otis prevailed by less than 100 votes.

References

Living people
People from Rye, New York
Hobart and William Smith Colleges alumni
New York University alumni
Maurice A. Deane School of Law alumni
Democratic Party members of the New York State Assembly
Mayors of places in New York (state)
21st-century American politicians
1956 births